The 2001–02 Southern Illinois Salukis men's basketball team represented Southern Illinois University Carbondale during the 2001–02 NCAA Division I men's basketball season. The Salukis were led by fourth-year head coach Bruce Weber and played their home games at the SIU Arena in Carbondale, Illinois as members of the Missouri Valley Conference. They finished the season 28–8, 14–4 in MVC play to finish tied for first place. They lost in the championship game of the MVC tournament to Creighton, but still received an at-large bid to the NCAA tournament as No. 11 seed in the East region. The Salukis upset Texas Tech and Georgia to reach the Sweet Sixteen, but fell to Connecticut in the regional semifinal round.

Roster

Schedule and results

|-
!colspan=12 style=| Non-conference regular season

|-
!colspan=12 style=| Missouri Valley regular season

|-
!colspan=12 style=| Missouri Valley tournament

|-
!colspan=12 style=| NCAA tournament

Rankings

References

2001-02
2001–02 Missouri Valley Conference men's basketball season
Southern Illinois
2001 in sports in Illinois
2002 in sports in Illinois